Ceroplesis aestuans is a species of beetle in the family Cerambycidae. It was described by Olivier in 1795. It is known from Benin, Eritrea, Cameroon, Senegal, Morocco, Togo, and Uganda.

Subspecies
 Ceroplesis aestuans aestuans (Olivier, 1795)
 Ceroplesis aestuans guineensis Hintz, 1920

References

aestuans
Beetles described in 1795